City of Lakes is a nickname for several places. It may refer to:

Places

Asia
 Bangalore, Karnataka, India
 Bathinda, Punjab, India (thermal lakes)
 Bhopal, Madhya Pradesh, India
 Hanoi, Vietnam
 Nainital, Uttarakhand, India
 Pokhara, Nepal
 Thane, Maharashtra, India
 Udaipur, Rajasthan, India
 Hyderabad, Telangana, India

North America
 Dartmouth, Nova Scotia, Canada
 Greater Sudbury, Ontario, Canada
 Minneapolis, Minnesota, United States
 Lake Mary, Florida, United States

Music
 "City of Lakes", a song on the album Matt Mays
 City of Lakes (album), an album by Irish ambient composer Seamus Ó Muíneacháin. 

Lakes